Hapithus saltator, the Jumping Bush Cricket, is a species of cricket in the family Gryllidae. It is found in North America.

References

 
 

Crickets